Division is the fourth studio album by the American alternative metal band 10 Years and second major label release which was released May 13, 2008. The first single was "Beautiful". It has so far sold over 250,000 copies in the US.

Track listing

Additionally, an acoustic version of "Beautiful" is available for download with purchases through retailer f.y.e.

10 Years added the second single, So Long, Good-Bye. A rock version was added to their Myspace page which was released on October 7, 2008 and was made available on iTunes on December 16, 2008.

The third single, Actions & Motives, was released as a digital bundle with the song, an acoustic version of "Russian Roulette", and the video Actions & Motives (Promotional Video) [Mono Version] on iTunes on May 26, 2009.

Charts

Personnel

Band
 Jesse Hasek – vocals
 Ryan Johnson – guitar
 Matt Wantland – guitar
 Lewis Cosby – bass
 Brian Vodinh – drums

Guests
 Joe Carolus – Piano on "Proud of You"
 Alaina Alexander – Background vocals on "Proud of You" and spoken word on "Planets 2"
 Travis Wyrick – Co-wrote "Beautiful" and "Picture Perfect (In Your Eyes)"
 Dean DeLeo – Co-wrote "Focus"

References

2008 albums
10 Years (band) albums
Republic Records albums